Holt Township is a township in Taylor County, Iowa, USA.

History
Holt Township is believed to be named for its first clerk.

References

Townships in Taylor County, Iowa
Townships in Iowa